Babaali (also Romanized as Bābā‘alī; also known as Bābā‘alī-ye Nūrī) is a village in Kuhdasht-e Shomali Rural District, in the Central District of Kuhdasht County, Lorestan Province, Iran. At the 2006 census, its population was 20, in 5 families.

References 

Towns and villages in Kuhdasht County